The sombre rock chat (Oenanthe dubia) is a species of passerine bird in the family Muscicapidae.
It is found in Ethiopia and Somalia.
Its natural habitat is subtropical or tropical dry shrubland.

The sombre rock chat was formerly included in the genus Cercomela. Molecular phylogenetic studies published in 2010 and 2012 found that the genus Cercomela was polyphyletic with five species, including the sombre rock chat, phylogenetically nested within the genus Oenanthe. As part of a reorganization of the species to create monotypic genera, the sombre rock chat was moved to the genus Oenanthe.

References

Wheatears
Birds described in 1899
Taxonomy articles created by Polbot